Kenko or Kenkō (健康) (Japanese for "health") may refer to:
 Kenko (company), a Japanese manufacturer of photographic accessories
 Kenko, Peru, an archaeological site in the Cusco Region of Peru
 Kenko, a crater in Mercury

People

Surname
 Satoshi Kenkō (1967–1998), Japanese sumo wrestler

Given name
 Kenko Matsuki (born 1959), Japanese politician
 Kenkō Yoshida (1283–1352), Japanese author and Buddhist monk
 Kenko Takebe (1664–1739), Japanese mathematician
 Kenko Miura (born 1979), Japanese racing driver
 Kenko Nakaima, one of the founders of Ryūei-ryū karate

See also 
 Kenkō Zenrakei Suieibu Umishō, a 2005 manga series by Mitsuru Hattori
 Kenko-Hoken (Social Insurance) and Kokumin-Kenko-Hoken (National Health Insurance), the two main categories of health insurance in Japan
 Kenco, instant coffee

Japanese masculine given names
Japanese-language surnames